Michael Ryan DiMuro (born October 12, 1967) is a former umpire in Major League Baseball. In 1997, DiMuro briefly became the first American umpire to work in Japanese baseball. On May 29, 2010, DiMuro was the home plate umpire for Roy Halladay's perfect game, the 20th perfect game recorded in MLB history.

Japanese baseball
In 1997, DiMuro umpired in the Japanese Central League in an experiment designed to introduce American umpiring standards to Nippon Professional Baseball. However, DiMuro was stunned by the casual acceptance of abuse toward umpires; after he ejected Chunichi Dragons hitter Yasuaki Taiho from a game for arguing balls and strikes, players and the team's manager swarmed him in protest and Taiho shoved him in the chest. Other than the ejection, there were no penalties assessed to Taiho, and after consulting with officials of both the Central League and the American League, DiMuro resigned and returned to the United States.

Personal life
DiMuro currently resides in Colorado. Upon graduation from Salpointe Catholic High School, he earned a BA in Communications from the University of San Diego in 1990. He is an FAA licensed commercial pilot. DiMuro co-founded an organization called "Blue For Kids" with fellow umpire Marvin Hudson in 2004. The organization is now called UMPS CARE Charities and is the official charity for Major League Umpires.

Mike's father Lou was an American League umpire from 1963 until 1982, when he died of injuries sustained from being hit by a car. His father also wore number 16 during his major league career. Mike's twin brother Ray also worked occasional games as a substitute umpire in the AL from 1996 to 1999.  DiMuro retired on July 18, 2019, after a 20-year career.

See also 

List of Major League Baseball umpires

References

External links
Major league profile
UMPS CARE Charities
Retrosheet
Umpire Ejection Fantasy League profile

1967 births
Living people
American expatriate baseball people in Japan
Commercial aviators
Major League Baseball umpires
People from Dunkirk, New York
American twins
Twin sportspeople
University of San Diego alumni